Thomas Frank Brenchley CMG (9 April 1918 – 7 July 2011) was a British diplomat.

Career

Frank Brenchley was educated at Sir William Turner's School, Coatham, North Yorkshire, and Merton College, Oxford. He served with the Royal Corps of Signals 1939–46 as an intelligence officer in the Middle East. He was assistant military attaché at Ankara 1943–45 while the spy Cicero was operating, and was Director, Telecommunications Liaison, Syria and Lebanon, 1945–46. After leaving the army he spent two years as a civil servant at GCHQ before transferring to the Foreign Office in 1949. He served in Singapore, Cairo, MECAS, Khartoum and Jeddah before returning to London as Head of the Arabian Department of the Foreign Office 1963–67 and then Assistant Under-Secretary of State, Foreign Office, 1967–68.

Brenchley was Ambassador to Norway 1968–72, Ambassador to Poland 1972–74 and finally Deputy Secretary, Cabinet Office, 1975–76. He retired from the Diplomatic Service and became Deputy Secretary-General and then Chief Executive of the Arab-British Chamber of Commerce 1976–83. He was chairman of the Institute for Study of Conflict 1983–89, chairman of the Research Institute for the Study of Conflict and Terrorism 1989–94, and also president of the International Institute for the Study of Conflict in Geneva 1989–91.

During his retirement Brenchley returned to Merton College, Oxford, as member of the Senior Common Room in 1987 and as honorary Fellow in 1991. He gained a DPhil doctorate in 2001.

In 1986 he presented his collection of first editions and papers by and about T. S. Eliot to Merton College Library and also presented a bust of Eliot by Jacob Epstein which has been placed in the foyer of the new lecture theatre named after the poet.

Brenchley was appointed CMG in the 1964 New Year Honours.

Publications
 Norway and her Soviet Neighbour: NATO's Arctic Frontier, Institute for the Study of Conflict, 1982
 Diplomatic Immunities and State-sponsored Terrorism in Conflict Studies no.164, Institute for the Study of Conflict, London, 1984. ISSN 0069-8792
 Living With Terrorism: the problem of air piracy, Institute for the Study of Conflict, 1986
 Britain and the Middle East: an economic history 1945–87, Lester Crook, London, 1989. 
 Aegean Conflict and the Law of the Sea in Conflict Studies no.232, 1990.
 Britain and the 1967 Arab-Israeli War, DPhil thesis, University of Oxford, 2000
 Britain, the Six-Day War and its Aftermath, I. B.Tauris, London, 2005.

References

1918 births
2011 deaths
People educated at Sir William Turner's Grammar School, Redcar
Alumni of Merton College, Oxford
British Army personnel of World War II
Royal Corps of Signals officers
Ambassadors of the United Kingdom to Norway
Ambassadors of the United Kingdom to Poland
Companions of the Order of St Michael and St George
GCHQ people